Strangers May Kiss is a 1931 American pre-Code drama film produced and released by Metro-Goldwyn-Mayer and noncredit-directed by George Fitzmaurice. The movie stars Norma Shearer, Robert Montgomery and Neil Hamilton. The movie was an adaptation of the book Strangers May Kiss, which was written by Ursula Parrott.

Plot
Lisbeth is a proud, glamorous, sexy woman whose core beliefs about love and marriage revolve around the idea of freedom. She falls in love with a newspaper reporter named Alan, who agrees that their relationship should remain friendly and physical. Steve, her childhood friend who is very much in love with her, watches from afar as Lisbeth is with other men, but wants her to be happy.

Her relationship with Alan soon becomes difficult. Lisbeth's aunt Celia firmly believes that love and marriage are intertwined, saying that "marriage and love are not enemies. A woman doesn't know how to be in love until she's been married ten years." Unfortunately for her, she soon finds out that her husband has been cheating on her. After much contemplation, she commits suicide by jumping out of her apartment window.

Alan, shocked by what happened, is afraid that Lisbeth will love him the same way that Celia loved her husband. As a result, he simply leaves for a month, not telling Lisbeth where he is going or when he will be back. Lisbeth tries to shake it off but quickly forgives Alan when he comes back. Alan takes her to Mexico for a vacation, where they are happy for some time. However, he later tells her that he has to leave for a new assignment in China and that he didn't plan on taking her with him. He leaves her even more heartbroken when he tells her that he has a wife back at his home and that he shouldn't get too comfortable with their relationship.

Instead of returning home, she decides to travel to Europe for two years and "have fun", becoming so promiscuous that she develops a reputation throughout Paris. One day, Steve tracks her down with the intention of marrying her. On that same day, Alan calls to tell her that he divorced his wife and was coming to see her in person, which obviously makes her happy. However, he quickly learns about her sexual past and leaves her again, still heartbroken. Lisbeth returns to New York and years later runs into Alan at the theater one night. Alan tells Lisbeth that he has forgiven her and once again, Lisbeth goes running right back to him.

Cast

Main cast
Norma Shearer as Lisbeth
Robert Montgomery as Steve
Neil Hamilton as Alan
Marjorie Rambeau as Geneva
Irene Rich as Celia
Hale Hamilton as Andrew
Conchita Montenegro as Spanish Dancer
Jed Prouty as Harry
Albert Conti as De Bazan
Henry Armetta as Waiter
George Davis as Waiter

Unbilled
Robert Livingston
André Cheron as Headwaiter
Bess Flowers as Dining Extra
Wilbur Mack as Diner with Andrew
Chris-Pin Martin as Mexican
Ray Milland as Third Admirer
Sandra Morgan as Dining Companion
Karen Morley as Dining Companion
Edward J. Nugent as Second Admirer
Lee Phelps as Bartender
Kane Richmond as First Admirer
Jack Trent as Silent Admirer

References

External links
Strangers May Kiss at IMDb.com

Strangers May Kiss at Rotten Tomatoes
Strangers May Kiss at Variety

1931 films
Films directed by George Fitzmaurice
Metro-Goldwyn-Mayer films
Films based on American novels
1931 drama films
American drama films
American black-and-white films
Films based on works by Ursula Parrott
1930s American films